Quadro Nuevo is a German acoustic quartet which was founded in 1996 by guitarist Robert Wolf, reedist Mulo Francel, accordionist Andreas Hinterseher and bassist D. D. Lowka. They have an "alchemical acoustic sound from elements of flamenco, Balkan swing, traditional folk, and avant-garde improvisation".

Discography 
 Luna Rossa (1998)
 Buongiorno Tristezza (1999)
 CinéPassion (2000)
 Canzone della Strada (2002)
 Mocca Flor (2004)
 Tango Bitter Sweet (2006)
 Antakya (2008)
 Grand Voyage (2010)
 Schöne Kinderlieder (2011)
 Quadro Nuevo "In Concert" (2011)
 End of the Rainbow (2013)
 Bethlehem (2013)
 Tango (2015)
 Flying Carpet (2017)
 Volkslied Reloaded (2019)

as well as a live-recording of a concert during the 35th Jazz-Festival in Burghausen/ Germany ("Jazzwoche Burghausen") on DVD (Quadro Nuevo LIVE)

References

External links

 Official Site
 Record Company

German jazz ensembles
Musical groups established in 1996